Burma Economic Watch is a periodical produced by the Macquarie University of Sydney, Australia. It provides information and analysis on the economy of Burma.

External links
Burma Economic Watch

Mass media in Myanmar
Macquarie University